Helicia recurva is a species of rainforest trees, of northeastern Queensland, Australia, from the flowering plant family Proteaceae.

They are endemic to the upland rainforests of the Wet Tropics region, from about  altitude.

 this species has the official, current, Qld government conservation status of "near threatened" species.

References

recurva
Proteales of Australia
Flora of Queensland